Jon Card (born December 11, 1960) is a German-Canadian drummer.  He has played in the punk rock bands Personality Crisis, SNFU, D.O.A., and The Subhumans.

Career
Born to a Royal Canadian Air Force pilot in Zweibrücken, Germany, he relocated to Canada at age four, Card grew up in Calgary, Alberta.  After playing with the heavy metal band Stonehenge, he formed his first punk band, Plasticide (later renamed Suburban Slag,) in his late teens.  In 1981 he joined the Winnipeg-based band Personality Crisis, with whom he played with for three years before their 1984 breakup.  He then played in the popular Canadian punk band SNFU for two years, who were at that time based in Edmonton.  He appeared on their second LP, If You Swear, You'll Catch No Fish, and recorded additional material with the group included on their The Last of the Big Time Suspenders compilation album.  In 1988, he also contributed to Vancouver-based NoMeansNo's Small Parts Isolated and Destroyed album as a guest musician.

Card next joined D.O.A. for several years and records, departing in 1991.  He thereafter joined the reunited SNFU for a 1991 tour, but did not stay with the band as they proceeded to sign with Epitaph Records and tour extensively.

Card played with alternative country artist Linda McRae on her 2002 album Cryin' Out Loud, and later played in Ani Kyd's band.  He joined the long-standing Canadian punk band The Subhumans for their 2005 reunion.  They signed with the Alternative Tentacles and G7 Welcoming Committee record labels and released the New Dark Age Parade LP the next year. In 2010, Card also rejoined SNFU, marking his third stint with the band.  He appeared on their Never Trouble Trouble Until Trouble Troubles You album three years later.

References

External links
Official Subhumans page

1960 births
Canadian punk rock drummers
Canadian male drummers
Living people
People from Zweibrücken
D.O.A. (band) members
SNFU members
Subhumans (Canadian band) members